Austral String Quartet is the name of two Sydney string quartet ensembles:
 Austral String Quartet (1910s), under the leadership of Cyril Monk
 Austral String Quartet (1950s-1970s), under the leadership of Donald Hazelwood